Arthur Frederick Morley (17 January 1908 – 14 December 1977) was an Australian rules footballer who played for the North Melbourne Football Club in the Victorian Football League (VFL).

Morley later served in the Army Reserve from February 1942 after enlisting in Claremont, Western Australia.

Notes

External links 

1908 births
1977 deaths
Australian rules footballers from Victoria (Australia)
North Melbourne Football Club players
Australian rules footballers from Fremantle
Military personnel from Western Australia
Australian military personnel of World War II